HD 96700 is the Henry Draper Catalogue designation for a star in the equatorial constellation of Hydra. It has an apparent visual magnitude of 6.51, which puts it below the limit that can be seen with the naked eye by a typical observer. (According to the Bortle scale, it is possible for some observers to see it from dark rural skies.) Based upon parallax measurements, this star is around 83 light years away from the Sun. It is drifting further away with a radial velocity of 12.8 km/s.

This is considered a high proper motion star, shifting its position across the celestial sphere at a rate of 0.52 arc seconds per year, along a position angle of 255.21°.

HD 96700 is a G-type main sequence star with a stellar classification of G0 V. It has a slightly lower mass than the Sun and a lower metallicity. The estimated size is similar to the Sun, ranging from 96% to 110% depending on the method used. The effective temperature of the star's outer atmosphere is 5,879 K, giving it the yellow-hued glow of a G-type star. It appears to be much older than the Sun, with age estimates ranging up to 11.9 billion years.

A 2015 survey ruled out the existence of any additional stellar companions at projected distances from 7 to 209 astronomical units.

Planetary system
Two planetary companions have been discovered by the HARP instrument, which measures variations in the star's radial velocity that are presumed to be caused by gravitational perturbations from orbiting objects. The innermost planet, HD 96700 b, is orbiting close to the star at a distance of roughly 0.08 AU with a brief orbital period of 8.13 days. It has at least nine times the mass of the Earth, and so may be a Neptune-like planet. But until astronomers can determine the orbital inclination or directly image the planet, there is no way to know for certain its actual mass.

The second companion, HD 96700 c, is orbiting at roughly the same distance as Mercury from the Sun, with a semimajor axis of 0.42 AU and a period of around 103 days. It may have a relatively high eccentricity of 0.4. This object has at least 13 times the mass of the Earth. Both planets existence was confirmed in 2021, and additional planetary companion orbiting between two confirmed planets was proposed.

Existence of planets b and c was confirmed in 2017, and by 2021 it was suspected a third Super-Earth planet HD 96700 d is orbiting between their orbits.

References 

G-type main-sequence stars
Exoplanets detected by radial velocity
Planetary systems with two confirmed planets

Hydra (constellation)
4328
Durchmusterung objects
Gliese and GJ objects
96700
054400